Workington man is a political term used by polling companies in the United Kingdom. Named after the Cumbria town of Workington, the term was first used ahead of the 2019 general election. Workington man describes the stereotypical swing voter who it was believed would determine the election result. Their support of the Conservatives in the 2019 election helped the party break the Labour Party's Red Wall of safe seats.

The term was invented by Onward, a centre right think tank, with a Guardian article describing the characteristics of Workington man as a northern male over the age of 45 without a university degree, who enjoys rugby league, and who had previously supported Labour but voted for Brexit in the 2016 referendum. The Financial Times described the term as "just the latest depressing political caricature". The term is similar to political stereotypes used at previous elections, such as Worcester woman, who were thought to define the characteristics of a key target voter.

Labour had held the Workington constituency for most of its 100-year history, with the exception being the period following the 1976 by-election, which saw a Conservative candidate elected against a backdrop of Labour in government at national level. Less than three years after this by-election victory, the seat returned to Labour at the 1979 general election. Going into the 2019 general election, it was seen as a key marginal seat for the Conservatives to win from Labour. On a 9.7% swing, it fell to the Conservatives on election night, marking the first time the seat had elected a Conservative at a general election.

See also
Essex man
Worcester woman
Holby City woman
Soccer mom
Reagan Democrat
Squeezed middle
Yuppie
Motorway man

References

2019 United Kingdom general election
English culture
2019 in British politics
Political terms in the United Kingdom
Politics of Allerdale
Polling terms
Stereotypes
Workington
Socioeconomic stereotypes